Emily Magee (born October 31, 1965) is an American operatic soprano.

Born in New York City, Magee studied music at Westminster Choir College, from which she graduated in 1987. She continued her studies at the Jacobs School of Music of Indiana University Bloomington, where her teachers included Margaret Harshaw.

In 1995, Magee made her operatic debut at the Lyric Opera of Chicago, singing the role of Fiordiligi in Mozart's Così fan tutte. Her international debut came in 1996 at the Berlin State Opera, under the direction of Daniel Barenboim. Magee's selected recordings, on CD and DVD, include:
 Lohengrin (Elsa), with Peter Seiffert; conductor: Daniel Barenboim
 Die Meistersinger von Nürnberg (Eva); conductor: Daniel Barenboim
 Peter Grimes (Ellen Orford); conductor: Franz Welser-Möst
 Ariadne auf Naxos (Ariadne); Zurich Opera; conductor: Christoph von Dohnányi
 Rusalka; conductor: Franz Welser-Möst
 Tosca, with Jonas Kaufmann and Thomas Hampson; Zürich Opera
 Salome; Frankfurt Radio Symphony; conductor: Andrés Orozco-Estrada

Magee and her husband, who is also her agent, live in Boulder, Colorado, United States.

References

External links
 
 Robert Cummings, AllMusic.com page on Emily Magee
 Hilbert Artists Management GMbH German-language page on Emily Magee

1965 births
Living people
American operatic sopranos
Singers from New York City
Classical musicians from New York (state)
21st-century American women